The A-Rosa Bella (registered ship name: A'Rosa Bella) is a German river cruise ship, cruising on the Danube river. The ship was built by Neptun Werft GmbH at their shipyard in Warnemünde, Germany, and entered service in May 2002. Her sister ships are A-Rosa Donna, A-Rosa Mia and A-Rosa Riva. Her home port is currently Rostock.

Features
The ship has two restaurants, two lounges and two bars, Finnish sauna, biosauna and resting area.

See also
 List of river cruise ships

References

External links
A-Rosa Bella position

2002 ships
River cruise ships